Neozimiris is a genus of long-spinneret ground spiders that was first described by Eugène Louis Simon in 1903.

Species
 it contains nine species, found in the Caribbean, Ecuador, Colombia, the United States, Mexico, and Panama:
Neozimiris chickeringi Platnick & Shadab, 1976 – Panama
Neozimiris crinis Platnick & Shadab, 1976 – Mexico
Neozimiris escandoni Müller, 1987 – Colombia
Neozimiris exuma Platnick & Shadab, 1976 – Bahama Is.
Neozimiris levii Platnick & Shadab, 1976 – Curaçao
Neozimiris nuda Platnick & Shadab, 1976 – Puerto Rico
Neozimiris pinta Platnick & Shadab, 1976 – Ecuador (Galapagos Is.)
Neozimiris pinzon Platnick & Shadab, 1976 – Ecuador (Galapagos Is.)
Neozimiris pubescens (Banks, 1898) (type) – USA, Mexico

See also
 List of Prodidominae species

References

Araneomorphae genera
Prodidominae
Spiders of North America
Spiders of South America